Dorstenia is a genus within the mulberry family, Moraceae. Depending on the author, there are said to be 100 to 170 species within this genus, second only in number to the genus Ficus within Moraceae. Dorstenia species are mainly known for their unusual inflorescences and growth habits. Dorstenia is named in honor of the German physician and botanist Theodor Dorsten (1492–1552). The type species is Dorstenia contrajerva.

Growth habit
Dorstenia is unique in the family Moraceae because of the extremely diverse growth habits and forms of its species. While the majority of Moraceae are woody perennials, Dorstenia species are predominantly  herbaceous, succulent, or suffrutescent perennials. Only 10% exhibit the typical woody habit of the Moraceae.

The spectrum of the genus Dorstenia ranges from small annuals to perennial herbaceous plants with and without rhizomes or tubers, geophytes, lithophytes, epiphytes, woody shrubs and succulents (stem or leaf succulents). Their juice is mostly milky white, rarely yellow or colorless. The hairs that are found on most species are at least partially hook-shaped.

The leaves mostly are arranged in spirals and rosettes, and rarely as two-rowed leaves. The leaf blades may be shield-, hand- or foot-shaped, whole, incised, lobed or feathered. Usually the leaf edges are perforated or notched. The ever-present stipulae are also variable in shape. Usually they are leathery, sometimes large, leaf-like and durable or sometimes small, awl-shaped and quickly falling off.

Reproductive structure and fruits
The most striking characteristic of Dorstenia is their reproductive structure, called pseudanthium (Greek for "false flower") or in Moraceae hypanthium, which is composed of clusters of tiny unisexual flowers on a disc- or cup-shaped receptacle that are often adorned with bracts of various sizes and shapes. The pseudanthiums can be planar, convex, concave, round, oval, square, lobed, twig, star, boot, or tongue-shaped. Their color varies from green to yellowish and reddish to violet and brown. Beneath the pseudanthium, there are usually bracts, scattered or in rows, sometimes carrying appendages. Sometimes the bracts are absent and only their remaining tooth-shaped, awl-like, spatula-shaped or band-shaped appendages are recognizable.

The globular, tapered, or warty flowers are unisexual. The female flowers within the receptacle mature first. The male flowers are either scattered between the female flowers or are concentrated on the outer edge of the receptacle or are separated by a flower-free zone at the outer edge. They are stalked and carry one to four (usually two to three) free or almost free tepals and one to four (usually two to three) stamens. The sunken female flowers carry tubular tepals and a free fruit node with one or two, then mostly unequal scars. Like most members of the Moraceae, Dorstenia species have drupe-like fruits that are embedded in the receptacle. However, a special feature of Dorstenia drupes is that they explode to release and scatter the seeds by way of a centrifugal mechanism. The stone seeds are usually small with a minuscule endosperm.

Taxonomy
Dorstenia is part of the tribe Dorstenieae of the family Moraceae, and all three levels of classification are monophyletic from chloroplast and nuclear DNA phylogenies, with morphological characters that also support. The family Moraceae is a part of the monophyletic order Rosales, and within this order Moraceae is most closely related to the plant families Ulmaceae, Cannabaceae, and Urticaceae.

Evolution
Fossils of Ficus and Morus fruits have been found on the African continent, and are used to approximate the origin of the family Moraceae to a maximum of 135 million years ago. In a recent study using fossil fruits, Bayesian molecular dating, and maximum likelihood, researchers attempted to reconstruct the ancestral history of Dorstenia with ITS (internal transcribed spacer) sequences from ribosomal DNA of 35 Dorstenia species and seven out-group species from the different tribes within the Moraceae. The goal was to resolve a long-standing issue regarding Dorstenia; whether this genus diverged and radiated prior to the split of Africa and South America about 105 mya, and members of this genus are on separate continents by vicariance, or if this genus diverged post-split and Dorstenia became established in the Neotropics by seed dispersal.

This study produced a phylogeny indicating an initial Old World divergence around 112.3 mya, divergence and radiance of New World Dorstenia at 67.2 and 30.3 mya respectively, and an Old World group nested within the New World that radiated around 13.6 mya. The results of this phylogeny do not reveal whether vicariance or seed dispersal explains the biogeography; however, due to the small endosperm that is typical of Dorstenia seeds, it is unlikely that seed dispersal by animals is the reason for the New World and reemerged Old World species. The pattern seen does suggest several hypotheses regarding how the New World lineage came about as well as how three Old World Dorstenia species are nested in the New World clade. It is theorized that the New World lineage crossed over via Asia and then Beringia, established populations all throughout the North and South Americas, and when climate conditions changed (and North America was no longer tropical or subtropical), that the North American populations died out, leaving only those in South America. This idea also theoretically allows for Old World species nested within the New World lineage, with Dorstenia populations established in America returning to Africa via Beringia while climatic conditions were still favorable. For this hypothesis to receive more credence, fossil Dorstenia plants in North America would be needed.

Distribution and habitat
The species are fairly equally distributed between the Afrotropics and Neotropics. Only one species grows east of Arabia, in the tropical forests of Southern India and Sri Lanka.

Uses
South American species such as Dorstenia contrajerva and Dorstenia brasiliensis are a source of the herbal preparation contrayerva that has been used as a tonic and febrifuge, and as an antidote in South American folk medicine.
In North America powder made from the rootstocks and leaves of Dorstenia contrajerva is mixed with tobacco for improving the taste of cigarettes.
In Oman the tubers of Dorstenia foetida are cooked and eaten.   
Dorstenia barteri is used in West African folk medicine. Scientific research has shown that it contains numerous flavonoid compounds that have anti-microbial, anti-reverse transcriptase, and anti-inflammatory effects.

Species
In the past many species were described that are now considered synonyms. This is due to the great variability of many Dorstenia species. New species are still discovered, such as Dorstenia luamensis a hanging lithophyte from Congo, first described in 2014. The following list only contains the accepted species (without varieties) as listed in The Plant List.

 Dorstenia africana
 Dorstenia afromontana
 Dorstenia albertii
 Dorstenia alta
 Dorstenia angusticornis
 Dorstenia annua
 Dorstenia appendiculata
 Dorstenia arifolia
 Dorstenia aristeguietae
 Dorstenia africana
 Dorstenia astyanactis
 Dorstenia bahiensis
 Dorstenia barnimiana
 Dorstenia barteri
 Dorstenia belizensis
 Dorstenia benguellensis
 Dorstenia bergiana
 Dorstenia bicaudata
 Dorstenia bonijesu
 Dorstenia bowmanniana
 Dorstenia brasiliensis
 Dorstenia brevipetiolata
 Dorstenia brownii
 Dorstenia buchananii
 Dorstenia caatingae 
 Dorstenia caimitensis
 Dorstenia carautae
 Dorstenia cayapia
 Dorstenia ciliata
 Dorstenia choconiana
 Dorstenia colombiana
 Dorstenia conceptionis
 Dorstenia contensis
 Dorstenia contrajerva
 Dorstenia convexa
 Dorstenia crenulata
 Dorstenia cuspidata
 Dorstenia dinklagei
 Dorstenia dionga
 Dorstenia djettii
 Dorstenia dorstenioides
 Dorstenia drakena
 Dorstenia elata
 Dorstenia ellenbeckiana
 Dorstenia elliptica
 Dorstenia embergeri
 Dorstenia erythrantha
 Dorstenia excentrica
 Dorstenia fawcettii
 Dorstenia flagellifera
 Dorstenia foetida
 Dorstenia gigas
 Dorstenia goetzei
 Dorstenia grazielae
 Dorstenia gypsophila
 Dorstenia hildebrandtii
 Dorstenia hildegardis
 Dorstenia hirta
 Dorstenia holstii
 Dorstenia indica
 Dorstenia involuta
 Dorstenia jamaicensis
 Dorstenia kameruniana
 Dorstenia lanei
 Dorstenia lavrani
 Dorstenia le-testui
 Dorstenia lindeniana
 Dorstenia lujae
 Dorstenia mannii
 Dorstenia mariae
 Dorstenia milaneziana
 Dorstenia nummularia
 Dorstenia nyungwensis
 Dorstenia oligogyna
 Dorstenia panamensis
 Dorstenia paucibracteata
 Dorstenia peltata
 Dorstenia peruviana
 Dorstenia petraea
 Dorstenia picta
 Dorstenia poinsettiifolia
 Dorstenia prorepens
 Dorstenia psilurus
 Dorstenia ramosa
 Dorstenia renulata
 Dorstenia richardii
 Dorstenia rocana
 Dorstenia roigii
 Dorstenia scaphigera
 Dorstenia schliebenii
 Dorstenia setosa
 Dorstenia socotrana
 Dorstenia soerensenii
 Dorstenia solheidii
 Dorstenia subdentata
 Dorstenia subrhombiformis
 Dorstenia tayloriana
 Dorstenia tenera
 Dorstenia tentaculata
 Dorstenia tenuiradiata
 Dorstenia tenuis
 Dorstenia tessmannii
 Dorstenia thikaensis
 Dorstenia tuberosa
 Dorstenia turbinata
 Dorstenia turnerifolia
 Dorstenia ulugurensis
 Dorstenia umbricola
 Dorstenia urceolata
 Dorstenia uxpanapana
 Dorstenia variifolia
 Dorstenia vivipara
 Dorstenia warneckei
 Dorstenia yambuyaensis
 Dorstenia yangambiensis
 Dorstenia zambesiaca
 Dorstenia zanzibarica 
 Dorstenia zenkeri

References

External links

 
Afrotropical realm flora
Neotropical realm flora
Flora of Socotra
Taxa named by Carl Linnaeus
Moraceae genera